Manoj Shukla (born 27 February 1976), better known by his stage name Manoj Shukla ‛Muntashir’, is an Indian lyricist, poet, dialogue writer and screenwriter. He wrote several successful Hindi songs for films. These have included "Teri Mitti", "Galliyan", "Tere Sang Yaara", "Kaun Tujhe", Dil Meri Na Sune, "Phir Bhi Tumko Chaahunga", Baahubali: The Beginning, and Baahubali: 2 The Conclusion.

Early life
Muntashir was born on 27 February 1976 as Manoj Shukla into a Brhaman farming family in Gauriganj, Amethi, Uttar Pradesh, India, where he attended a HAL School Korwa. After graduating from Allahabad University in 1999 he moved to Mumbai to seek work, and subsequently entered the TV and film scene following an opportunity to write for Kaun Banega Crorepati. He is married to Neelam Shukla and they have a son.

Career
Muntashir has written the lyrics of several Hindi film songs including "Galliyan" from Ek Villain, "Tere Sang Yaara" from Rustom, "Kaun Tujhe" from M.S Dhoni: The Untold Story and "Dil Meri Na Sune" from the film "Genius".

He has collaborate with some talented composer like Arko Pravo Mukherjee, Amaal Mallik, Ankit Tiwari, Tanishk Bagchi, M. M. Keeravani, Rochak Kohli, Himesh Reshammiya, Vishal–Shekhar and many more.   

He has frequently voiced concerns with regards to acknowledgments to song and script writers. His lyrics to "Phir Bhi Tumko Chaahunga" (2017), a song which registered more than four million views through unofficial versions prior to its official release, were originally compiled for his wife in 2001. When he failed to receive acknowledgement for the song, he voiced that he didn't "know why certain people can't accept an age old fact that lyricists have an equal amount of contribution in making a song successful". Following a nomination for the 2020 Filmfare award for best lyrics for the song 'Teri Mitti' from the 2019 film Kesari, he tweeted his disappointment when the award went to someone else. He has won National Film Awards for best lyrics in Saina (film). 

He has written scripts for India's Got Talent and Indian Idol Junior. Muntashir wrote the Hindi dialogues for Baahubali 2, dubbing the words in Hindi to match the lip movements which spoke in Telugu. Later, he was commissioned to do the same for the Hollywood film, Black Panther.

His awards have included the Yash Bharti Award, the IIFA Awards and Radio Mirchi Music Awards. In 2019, he published a book titled Meri Fitrat Hai Mastana

Awards and nominations

Discography

References

External links

Indian male poets
Indian lyricists
People from Amethi district
1976 births
Living people
Poets from Uttar Pradesh